is a railway station operated by Kurobe Gorge Railway in Kurobe, Toyama Prefecture, Japan. Though the tracks continue southward to Kurobe Dam, access past Keyakidaira Station is limited to employees of the Kansai Electric Power Company (Kanden) and guided tours.

Station overview 

Keyakidaira Station is composed of two separate platforms that are separated by 200 m of elevation. The two platforms are connected by an elevator that is capable of carrying one train car at a time.

There are several onsens near Keyakidaira Station, some of which have ryokans operating at the springs.

Adjacent stations

References

External links 

  

Railway stations in Japan opened in 1953
Railway stations in Toyama Prefecture